Ross Cuthbert may refer to:

 Ross Cuthbert (politician) (1776–1861), Canadian writer, lawyer and politician
 Ross Cuthbert (ice hockey) (1892—1971), Canadian-born British ice hockey player